Events during the year 2017 in Italy.

Incumbents
 President: Sergio Mattarella
 Prime Minister: Paolo Gentiloni

Events 

 18 January 
January 2017 Central Italy earthquakes; 34 people are killed.
Rigopiano avalanche; 29 people are killed when the Hotel Rigopiano is demolished by an avalanche, following a series of earthquakes in the Abruzzo region.
 21 January – A bus carrying Hungarian students crashes near Verona with 16 people dead.
 11 February – Francesco Gabbani won Sanremo Music Festival 2017 by his YouTube sensational song Occidentali's Karma and went on to represent Italy in the Eurovision Song Contest 2017.
 26–27 May – The 43rd G7 summit was held in Taormina
3 June - 2017 Turin stampede
21 August - 2017 Ischia earthquake; two people were killed and 42 others were injured.
13 November - Italy failed to qualify for the 2018 FIFA World Cup after a 0–1 aggregate loss to Sweden in the two-leg play-off, missing World Cup for the first time since 1958. The head coach Gian Piero Ventura was subsequently sacked.

Deaths 

5 January
Tullio De Mauro, 84, linguist.
Leonardo Benevolo, 93, architect and city planner 
7 January – Lelio Lagorio, 91, politician
12 January – Giulio Angioni, Italian writer and anthropologist (b. 1939)
28 January – Salvatore Tatarella, 69, politician
8 March – Danilo Mainardi, 83, ethologist
23 March – Cino Tortorella, 89, television presenter
15 April – Emma Morano, 117, supercentenarian, world's oldest living person, oldest Italian person ever and last living person born in the 1800s
16 April – Gianni Boncompagni, 84, radio and television presenter

11 May – Clelio Darida, 90, politician
24 May – Giovanni Bignami, 73, physicist
26 May – Laura Biagiotti, 73, fashion designer

1 June – José Greci, 76, actress 
10 June – Oscar Mammì, 90, politician and former minister
23 June – Stefano Rodotà, 84, jurist and politician
17 June – Paolo Limiti, 77, television presenter
3 July – Paolo Villaggio, 84, actor

5 August – Dionigi Tettamanzi, 83, cardinal and former archbishop of Milan

1 September – Armando Aste, 91, alpinist
4 September – Gastone Moschin, actor (b. 1929)
9 September – Velasio de Paolis, 81, Italian Roman Catholic cardinal, President of the Prefecture for the Economic Affairs of the Holy See 2008–2011
27 September – Antonio Spallino, 92, fencer and politician, Olympic champion (1956) and Mayor of Como 1970–1985
1 October – Pierluigi Cappello, 50, poet, Viareggio Prize laureate 2010
3 October – Francesco Martino, politician, President of Region of Sicily 1993–1995 (born 1937)
5 October – Giorgio Pressburger, 80, Hungarian-born Italian writer
6 October – Roberto Anzolin, 79, footballer

8 October – Aldo Biscardi, 86, television presenter

21 October – Emilio D'Amore, 102, politician, Deputy 1948–1958, 1963–1968

17 November – Salvatore Riina, 87, criminal and chief of the Sicilian Mafia
26 December – Gualtiero Marchesi, 87, chef
27 December – Osvaldo Fattori, footballer, 95

References 

 
2010s in Italy
Years of the 21st century in Italy
Italy
Italy